Evander Holyfield (born October 19, 1962) is an American former professional boxer who competed between 1984 and 2011. He reigned as the undisputed champion at cruiserweight in the late 1980s and at heavyweight in the early 1990s, and is the only boxer in history to win the undisputed championship in two weight classes in the three belt era. Nicknamed "the Real Deal", Holyfield is the only four-time world heavyweight champion, having held the unified WBA, WBC, and IBF titles from 1990 to 1992, the WBA and IBF titles again from 1993 to 1994, the WBA title a third time from 1996 to 1999; the IBF title a third time from 1997 to 1999 and the WBA title for a fourth time from 2000 to 2001.

As an amateur, Holyfield represented the United States at the 1984 Summer Olympics, winning a bronze medal in the light heavyweight division. He turned professional at the age of 21, moving up to cruiserweight in 1985 and winning his first world championship the following year, defeating Dwight Muhammad Qawi for the WBA title. Holyfield then went on to defeat Ricky Parkey and Carlos de León to win the WBC and IBF titles, thus becoming the undisputed cruiserweight champion. He moved up to heavyweight in 1988, later defeating Buster Douglas in 1990 to claim the unified WBA, WBC and IBF heavyweight titles and the undisputed heavyweight championship.

He successfully defended his titles three times, scoring victories over former champions George Foreman and Larry Holmes, before suffering his first professional loss to Riddick Bowe in 1992. Holyfield regained the crown in a rematch one year later, defeating Bowe for the WBA and IBF titles (Bowe having relinquished the WBC title beforehand). Holyfield later lost these titles in an upset against Michael Moorer in 1994.

Holyfield was forced to retire in 1994 upon medical advice, only to return a year later with a clean bill of health. In 1996 he defeated Mike Tyson and reclaimed the WBA title, in what was named by The Ring magazine as the Fight of the Year and Upset of the Year. This made Holyfield the first boxer since Muhammad Ali to win a world heavyweight title three times. Holyfield won a 1997 rematch against Tyson, which saw the latter disqualified in round three for biting off part of Holyfield's ear. During this reign as champion, he also avenged his loss to Michael Moorer and reclaimed the IBF title.

In 1999 he faced Lennox Lewis in a unification fight for the undisputed WBA, WBC and IBF titles, which ended in a controversial split draw. Holyfield was defeated in a rematch eight months later. The following year, he defeated John Ruiz for the vacant WBA title, becoming the first boxer in history to win a version of the heavyweight title four times. Holyfield lost a rematch against Ruiz seven months later and faced him for the third time in a draw.

Holyfield retired in 2014, and is ranked number 77 on The Rings list of 100 greatest punchers of all time and in 2002 named him the 22nd greatest fighter of the past 80 years. He currently ranks No.91 in BoxRec's ranking of the greatest pound for pound boxers of all time. BoxingScene ranked him the greatest cruiserweight of all time. He is also the first boxer to hold world titles in three different decades, in the 1980s, 1990s and 2000s.

Early life
Evander Holyfield was born on October 19, 1962, in the mill town of Atmore, Alabama. The youngest of nine children, Holyfield was much younger than his other siblings and was born from a different father. Holyfield's family later moved to Atlanta, Georgia, where he was raised in the crime-ridden Bowen Homes Housing Projects. He began boxing at age seven and won the Boys Club boxing tournament. At 13, he qualified to compete in his first Junior Olympics. By age 15, Holyfield became the Southeastern Regional Champion, winning this tournament and the Best Boxer Award. By 1984 he had a record of 160 wins and 14 losses, with 76 by knockout.

When he was 20 years old, Holyfield represented the U.S. in the 1983 Pan American Games in Caracas, Venezuela, where he won a silver medal after losing to Cuban world champion Pablo Romero. The following year, he was the National Golden Gloves Champion, and won a bronze medal in the 1984 Summer Olympic Games in Los Angeles, California, after a controversial disqualification in the second round of the semi-final against New Zealand's Kevin Barry.

Professional career

Light heavyweight
Holyfield started out professionally as a light heavyweight with a televised win in six rounds over Lionel Byarm at Madison Square Garden on November 15, 1984. On January 20, 1985, he won another six-round decision over Eric Winbush in Atlantic City, New Jersey. On March 13, he knocked out Fred Brown in the first round in Norfolk, Virginia, and on April 20, he knocked out Mark Rivera in two rounds in Corpus Christi, Texas.

Cruiserweight

Both he and his next opponent, Tyrone Booze, moved up to the cruiserweight division for their fight on July 20, 1985, in Norfolk, Virginia. Holyfield won an eight-round decision over Booze. He then went on to knock out Rick Myers in the first round on August 29 in his hometown of Atlanta. On October 30 in Atlantic City Holyfield knocked out opponent Jeff Meachem in five rounds, and his last fight for 1985 was against Anthony Davis on December 21 in Virginia Beach, Virginia. He won by knocking out Davis in the fourth round.

He began 1986 with a knockout in three rounds over former world cruiserweight challenger Chisanda Mutti, and proceeded to beat Jessy Shelby and Terry Mims before being given a world title try by the WBA Cruiserweight Champion Dwight Muhammad Qawi. In what was called by The Ring as the best cruiserweight bout of the 1980s, Holyfield became world champion by defeating Qawi by a narrow 15 round split decision. He culminated 1986 with a trip to Paris, France, where he beat Mike Brothers by a knockout in three, in a non-title bout.

In 1987, he defended his title against former Olympic teammate and Gold medal winner Henry Tillman, who had beaten Mike Tyson twice as an amateur. He retained his belt, winning by seventh-round knockout, and then went on to unify his WBA belt with the IBF belt held by Ricky Parkey, knocking Parkey out in three rounds. For his next bout, he returned to France, where he retained the title with an eleven-round knockout against former world champion Ossie Ocasio. In his last fight of 1987, he offered Muhammad Qawi a rematch and, this time, he beat Qawi by a knockout in only four rounds.

1988 was another productive year for Holyfield; he started by becoming the first universally recognized World Cruiserweight Champion after defeating the Lineal & WBC Champion Carlos De León at Las Vegas. The fight was stopped after eight rounds.

Heavyweight

After that fight, he announced he was moving up in weight to pursue the World Heavyweight Championship held by Tyson. His first fight as a Heavyweight took place on July 16, when he beat former Tyson rival James "Quick" Tillis by a knockout in five, in Lake Tahoe, Nevada (Tillis had gone the distance with Tyson). For his third and final bout of 1988, he beat former Heavyweight Champion Pinklon Thomas, also by knockout, in seven rounds.

Holyfield began 1989 meeting another former Heavyweight Champion, Michael Dokes. This fight was named one of the best fights of the 1980s by Ring magazine, as best heavyweight bout of the 1980s. Holyfield won by a knockout in the 10th round, and then he met Brazilian Champion Adilson Rodrigues, who lasted two rounds. His last fight of the 1980s was against Alex Stewart, a hard punching fringe contender. Stewart shocked Holyfield early, with quick, hard punches, but eventually fell in eight.

In 1990, Holyfield beat Seamus McDonagh, knocking him out in four rounds. By this time, Holyfield had been Ring Magazine's number-one contender for two years and had yet to receive a shot at Tyson's Heavyweight title.

Undisputed heavyweight champion

Holyfield had been promised a title shot against Tyson in 1990. Before that fight could occur, in what many consider to be the biggest upset in boxing history, relatively unknown boxer, 29-year-old, 231 lb. Buster Douglas defeated the 23-year-old, 218 lb. Mike Tyson in 10 rounds in Tokyo to become the new undisputed heavyweight champion. Instead of fighting Tyson, Holyfield was Douglas's first title defense.

They met on October 25, 1990. Douglas came into the fight at 246 lb. and offered little in the fight against Holyfield, who was in ideal shape at 208 lb. In the third round Douglas tried to start a combination with a big right uppercut. Holyfield countered with a straight right hand and Douglas went down for the count. Holyfield was the new undefeated, undisputed heavyweight champion of the World. At the time of the knockout, Holyfield was ahead on all three judges' scorecards, all seeing it 20–18 for Holyfield.

In his first defense, he beat former and future world champion George Foreman by unanimous decision. The fight was billed as a "Battle for the Ages", a reference to the age difference between the young undefeated champion (28 years old) and the much older George Foreman (42 years old). Holyfield weighed in at 208 pounds and Foreman weighed in at 257 pounds. Foreman lost the fight by a unanimous decision, but surprised many by lasting the whole 12 rounds against a much younger opponent, even staggering Holyfield a few times and knocking him off balance in the seventh round.

Then a deal was signed for him to defend his crown against Mike Tyson in November 1991. Tyson delayed the fight, claiming he was injured in training, but was then convicted for the rape of Desiree Washington and sentenced to six years in prison, so the fight did not happen at that time. They fought in 1996 (Holyfield won by a TKO in 11) and a rematch in 1997 (Holyfield won by disqualification in three, after Tyson bit both of his ears).

Holyfield made his next defense in Atlanta against late replacement in Bert Cooper over Francesco Damiani who suffered a foot injury in training days before the fight, Cooper surprised Holyfield with a very good effort. Holyfield scored the first knockdown of the fight against Cooper with a powerful shot to the body, but Cooper returned the favor with a good right hand that sent Holyfield against the ropes; while not an actual knockdown, referee Mills Lane gave Holyfield a standing eight-count. Having suffered the first technical knockdown of his professional career, Holyfield regained his composure quickly and administered a beating that left Cooper still on his feet, but unable to defend himself. Holyfield landed brutal power shots, culminated by repeated vicious uppercuts that snapped Cooper's head back. Referee Mills Lane stopped the bout in the seventh.

In his first fight of 1992, he faced 42 year old former world heavyweight champion Larry Holmes, and had just pulled off an upset against Ray Mercer. During the bout, Holyfield suffered the first scar of his career with a gash opening up over his eye, the result of Holmes' elbow. The fight ended with a unanimous decision in favor of Holyfield.

Holyfield–Bowe rivalry

In the beginning of a trilogy of bouts with the 25-year-old Riddick Bowe, who had won a silver medal in the 1988 Olympics, in the super heavyweight division, he suffered his first defeat when Bowe won the undisputed title by a 12-round unanimous decision in Las Vegas. Round ten of that bout was named the "Round of the Year" by The Ring. Holyfield was knocked down in round 11. He made the mistake of getting into a slugfest with the younger, bigger and stronger Bowe, leading to his defeat.

He began 1993 by beating Alex Stewart in a rematch, but this time over the 12-round unanimous distance.

Then came the rematch with Bowe on November 6, 1993. In what is considered by many sporting historians as one of the most bizarre moments in boxing's history, during round seven the crowd got off their feet and many people started to run for cover and yell. Holyfield took his eyes off Bowe for one moment and then told Bowe to look up to the skies. What they saw was a man in a parachute flying dangerously close to them. The man almost entered the ring, but his parachute had gotten entangled in the lights and he landed on the ropes and apron of the ring, and he was then pulled into the crowd, where he was beaten by members of Bowe's entourage. Bowe's pregnant wife, Judy, fainted and had to be taken to the hospital from the arena. Twenty minutes later, calm was restored and Holyfield went on to recover his world heavyweight titles with a close 12 round majority decision. The man who parachuted down to the middle of the ring became known as The Fan Man and the fight itself became known as the Fan Man Fight. His victory over Bowe that year helped Holyfield being named as ABC's Wide World of Sports Athlete of the Year for 1993.

Holyfield vs. Moorer, Holyfield vs. Bowe III

His next fight, April 1994, he met former WBO light heavyweight Michael Moorer, who was attempting to become the first southpaw to become the universally recognised world heavyweight champion. He dropped Moorer in round two, but lost a twelve-round majority decision. When he went to the hospital to have his shoulder checked, he was diagnosed with a heart condition and had to announce his retirement from boxing. It later surfaced that the chairman of the medical advisory board for the Nevada State Athletic Commission believed his condition to be consistent with HGH use.

However, watching a television show hosted by preacher Benny Hinn, Holyfield says he felt his heart heal. He and Hinn subsequently became friends and he became a frequent visitor to Hinn's crusades. In fact, during this time, Holyfield went to a Benny Hinn crusade in Philadelphia, had Hinn lay hands on him and gave Hinn a check for $265,000 after he was told he was healed. He then passed his next examination by the boxing commission. Holyfield later stated that his heart was misdiagnosed due to the morphine pumped into his body.

In 1995, Holyfield returned to the ring with a ten-round decision win versus former Olympic gold medalist, Ray Mercer. He was the first man to knock down Mercer.

Holyfield and Bowe then had their rubber match. Holyfield knocked Bowe down with a single left hook but Bowe prevailed by a knockout in eight. Holyfield later claimed that he contracted hepatitis before the fight.

Holyfield–Tyson rivalry

Holyfield vs. Tyson

In 1996, Holyfield met former world champion Bobby Czyz, beating him by a knockout in six. Afterwards, he and Mike Tyson met.

Tyson had recovered the WBC and WBA Heavyweight Championship and, after being stripped of the WBC title for not facing Lennox Lewis, defended the WBA title against Holyfield on November 9 of that year. Tyson was heavily favored to win, but Holyfield made history by defeating Tyson in an 11th round TKO. This was the third occasion on which Holyfield won the WBA Heavyweight title. However, the fight was not recognized as being for the lineal championship, which was held by George Foreman at the time.

Holyfield vs. Tyson II: The Bite Fight
Holyfield's rematch with Tyson took place on June 28, 1997. Known as "The Bite Fight", it went into the annals of boxing as one of the most bizarre fights in history. The infamous incident occurred in the third round, when Tyson bit Holyfield on one of his ears and had two points deducted. Referee Mills Lane decided to disqualify Tyson initially, but after Holyfield and the ringside doctor intervened and said Holyfield could continue, he relented and allowed the fight to go on. Tyson bit Holyfield again, this time on the other ear. Tyson's teeth tore off a small section of the top of his opponent's ear, known as the helix, and spat that bit of flesh out onto the canvas.

The immediate aftermath of the incident was bedlam. Tyson was disqualified and a melee ensued. Tyson claimed his bites were a retaliation to Holyfield's unchecked headbutts, which had cut him in both fights. Others argued that Tyson, knowing he was on his way to another knockout loss, was looking for a way out of the fight. Teddy Atlas, who had briefly trained Tyson seventeen years earlier, predicted that Tyson would get himself disqualified, calling Tyson "a very weak and flawed person".

Holyfield vs. Moorer II, Bean

Next came another rematch, this time against Michael Moorer, who had recovered the IBF's world title. Holyfield knocked Moorer to the canvas five times and referee Mitch Halpern stopped the fight between the eighth and ninth rounds under the advice of physician Flip Homansky. Holyfield once again unified his WBA belt with the IBF belt by avenging his defeat by Moorer.

In 1998 Holyfield had only one fight, making a mandatory defense against Vaughn Bean, who was defeated by decision at the Georgia Dome in the champion's hometown. For the first time, Holyfield's performance called into question whether age was diminishing his ability to continue as a championship fighter.

Holyfield–Lewis rivalry

Holyfield vs. Lewis
By 1999, the public was clamoring for a unification bout versus the WBC World Champion, Lennox Lewis of the United Kingdom. That bout happened in March of that year. The bout was declared a controversial draw after twelve rounds, where it appeared to most that Lewis dominated the fight. Holyfield claimed his performance was hindered by stomach and leg cramps. Holyfield and Lewis were ordered by the three leading organizations of which they were champions to have an immediate rematch.

Holyfield vs. Lewis II
The second time around, in November of that year, Lewis became the Undisputed Champion by beating Holyfield via unanimous decision by three American judges. "I haven't felt this good after a fight since I was a cruiserweight," Holyfield said; "It makes me think I should have fought a little harder against Lennox. Maybe I'd be sore and sick, but I'd have the victory."

Holyfield–John Ruiz trilogy

In 2000, Lewis was stripped of the WBA belt for failing to meet lightly regarded Don King fighter John Ruiz, having fought Ruiz's conqueror David Tua, and the WBA ordered Holyfield and Ruiz to meet for that organization's world title belt. Holyfield and Ruiz began their trilogy in August of that year, with Holyfield making history by winning on a controversial, but unanimous 12-round decision to become the first boxer in history to be the World Heavyweight Champion four times. Holyfield blamed his lackluster performance on a perforated (broken) eardrum.

Seven months later, in March 2001, it was Ruiz's turn to make history at Holyfield's expense when he surprisingly managed to knock Holyfield down and beat him by a 12-round decision to become the first Hispanic ever to win a Heavyweight title. On December 15 of that year, Holyfield challenged Ruiz for the title, in an attempt to become champion again. The fight was declared a draw and John Ruiz maintained the WBA Championship title.

Holyfield vs. Byrd

2002 began as a promising year for Holyfield: in June, he met former World Heavyweight Champion Hasim Rahman, to determine who would face Lewis next. Holyfield was leading on two of the three scorecards when the fight was stopped in the eighth round due to a severe hematoma on Rahman's forehead above his left eye that was caused by a headbutt earlier in the fight. Holyfield was ahead, so he was declared the winner by a technical decision.

The IBF decided to strip Lewis of his belt after he didn't want to fight Don King-promoted fighter Chris Byrd, instead going after Tyson, and declared that the winner of the fight between Holyfield and former WBO Heavyweight Champion Byrd would be recognized as their Heavyweight Champion. On December 14, 2002, Holyfield once again tried to become the first man ever to be Heavyweight Champion five times when he and Byrd met, but Byrd came out as the winner by a 12-round unanimous decision.

Consecutive losses, New York suspension

On October 4, 2003, Holyfield lost to James Toney by TKO when his corner threw in the towel in the ninth round. At age 42, Holyfield returned to the ring to face Larry Donald on November 13, 2004. He lost his third consecutive match in a twelve-round unanimous decision.

In August 2005 it had been reported that the New York State Athletic Commission had banned Evander Holyfield from boxing in New York due to "diminishing skills" despite the fact that Holyfield had passed a battery of medical tests.

Comeback

Holyfield was initially criticized for his ongoing comeback; but he was adamant that his losses to Toney and Donald were the result of a shoulder injury, not of old age. Holyfield had looked better in his first four fights since Donald and appeared to have answered the critics who say that he lacked the cutting edge and ability to follow up on crucial openings that he had in his youth.

Holyfield defeated Jeremy Bates by TKO on August 18, 2006, in a 10-round bout at American Airlines Center in Dallas, Texas. Holyfield dominated the fight which was stopped in the second round after he landed roughly twenty consecutive punches on Bates.

Holyfield defeated Fres Oquendo by unanimous decision on November 10, 2006, in San Antonio, Texas. Holyfield knocked Oquendo down in the first minute of the first round and continued to be the aggressor throughout the fight, winning a unanimous decision by scores of 116–111 and 114–113 twice.

On March 17, 2007, Holyfield defeated Vinny Maddalone by TKO when Maddalone's corner threw in the towel to save their man from serious injury in the ring.

On June 30, 2007, Holyfield defeated Lou Savarese, knocking the bigger and heavier Savarese down in the fourth and again in the ninth round, en route to a unanimous decision win. This was Holyfield's fourth win in ten months, two of them by KO. This victory finally set the stage for Holyfield's title fight against Sultan Ibragimov, for the WBO Heavyweight title.

Holyfield vs. Ibragimov

On October 13, 2007, Holyfield was defeated by Sultan Ibragimov. Although unable to defy his critics by winning a fifth Heavyweight title, Holyfield refused to be backed up by the young champion and even rattled him in the closing part of the 12th round. The fight was mostly uneventful, however, with neither fighter being truly staggered or knocked down. In most exchanges, Sultan was able to land two punches to Holyfield's one. The result was a unanimous decision for Ibragimov, with scores of 118–110 and 117–111 twice.

Holyfield vs. Valuev

He told BBC Scotland's Sports Weekly "I'm gonna fight, be the heavyweight champion of the world one more time. Then I'm gonna write another book and tell everybody how I did it." On December 20, 2008, he fought, at the Hallenstadion in Zürich, Switzerland, the WBA Heavyweight Champion Nikolai Valuev for a paycheck of $600,000, the lowest amount he has ever received for a championship fight. At the weigh-in, he weighed 214 pounds, Valuev weighed a career low of 310 pounds.

Valuev defeated Holyfield by a highly controversial majority decision after a relatively uneventful bout. One judge scored the bout a draw 114–114, while the others had Valuev winning 116–112 and 115–114. Many analysts were outraged at the decision, thinking Holyfield had clearly won. There was talk of a rematch in 2009.

The WBA did their own investigation into the controversial decision; "As the World Boxing Association (WBA) always cares about and respects the fans' and the media's opinion, the Championship Committee has ordered a panel of judges to review the tape of the fight between Nikolai Valuev and Evander Holyfield, for the WBA heavyweight title" read a statement from the WBA. The organization also expressed that they "will give a decision accordingly in the following weeks." Many speculated that an immediate rematch would be the most likely scenario, but this never materialised. Valuev lost the WBA title in his next fight against British boxer David Haye.

Holyfield vs. Botha
After the loss to Valuev, Holyfield took a period of inactivity. He reportedly agreed to fight South African boxer Francois Botha on January 16, 2010; it was agreed that the venue for the fight would be the Nelson Mandela Memorial Stadium in Kampala, Uganda. A few weeks before the fight, it was revealed that the bout would be postponed to February 20, 2010. The match was put in jeopardy due to economic disagreements but was later confirmed to be on April 10, 2010, at the Thomas & Mack Center in Las Vegas. When asked about his upcoming bout, the four-time world heavyweight champion said: "I've been hearing for a while that I can't do it. All it does is light a fire under me to prove people wrong." He added: "I can still fight. I don't want to leave until I've become the undisputed heavyweight champion one more time. That's been my goal the entire time." The American boxer scored an eighth-round knockout of Botha to win the vacant World Boxing Federation (WBF) Heavyweight title.

Holyfield started slowly as usual in the early going. Botha held and hit Holyfield, and took the control of the fight for the first three rounds. However, the South African could not slow down Holyfield, though he did hurt him, and the American boxer slowly began to punch him more to take control of the bout in the later rounds. In the seventh round Holyfield stunned Botha and knocked him down in the eighth round. Though he beat the count, Holyfield cornered him and landed many punches that forced the referee Russell Mora to stop the bout. At the time of the stoppage, Holyfield was behind on two judges' cards, 67–66, while the third judge had it 69–64 for the American boxer. Only 3,127 attended the fight.

Holyfield vs. Williams
After the Botha fight, Holyfield said he was interested in fighting either Vitali Klitschko, the current WBC champion, or his younger brother Wladimir Klitschko. Holyfield's next bout against Sherman "The Tank" Williams on November 5, 2010, at Joe Louis Arena in Detroit, Michigan, was then postponed twice before finally being rescheduled to January 22, 2011, and moved to The Greenbrier in White Sulphur Springs, West Virginia. Holyfield started the bout slowly and in the second round, he was cut in the left eye following an accidental clash of heads. In round three as he took several combinations. After the end of the round, Holyfield told his corner that he was unable to see due to the cut. Consequently, the bout was ruled a no contest.

The WBC had allegedly agreed to match Holyfield up with Vitali Klitschko after fights with Williams and Nielsen.

Holyfield vs. Nielsen
A fight with Brian Nielsen, the most popular Danish heavyweight in that country's history, was scheduled for March 5, 2011, in Denmark, but needed to be postponed to May 7, 2011, due to a cut Holyfield received in the Williams fight.

The official weigh-in was held on Friday night in Denmark, with Holyfield at 225 pounds, while his opponent Nielsen, with his shorts on, weighed 238 pounds. Nielsen had never been this light in his career. Nielsen had said that although it would be mighty difficult for him to beat Holyfield, he promised it would not be a one sided affair. Holyfield said that if he won he would move to next level and challenge for major titles.

Holyfield started the fight aggressively, pressing the 46-year-old Nielsen into the ropes and landing several hard jabs and hooks, knocking him down in the 3rd round. Despite getting a swollen eye in the 4th round, Nielsen kept on clowning to provoke Holyfield throughout the bout, prompting his trainer, Paul Duvill, to beg him to stop fooling around and focus on Holyfield. In round 10, Nielsen pushed a tired-looking Holyfield into the ropes with a series of combinations, before Holyfield turned it around. Holyfield pushed Nielsen into a corner and battered him with combinations until the referee stopped the contest.

Retirement
After the Nielsen fight, Holyfield attempted to land a shot at a world heavyweight title (all major belts were held by Wladimir and Vitali Klitschko, at that time). However, after more than a year of trying to land this fight, Yahoo News reported his intention to retire in 2012, with Holyfield stating, "The game's been good to me and I hope I've been good to the game. ... I'm 50 years old (on Friday) and I've pretty much did everything that I wanted to do in boxing." Later that same month, however, Holyfield seemed to change his mind, saying that he still considers himself a "serious contender." Unable to secure a title shot, his career went into limbo for several months. However, In June 2014, after not fighting in over three years, Holyfield announced his final retirement. He is currently a boxing adviser to heavyweight prospect Zhang Zhilei.

Exhibition bout

On April 16, 2021, it was announced that Holyfield would return to the ring on June 5, 2021, to face Kevin McBride (most widely known for defeating former undisputed heavyweight champion Mike Tyson) in an exhibition bout on the undercard of Teófimo López vs. George Kambosos Jr. However, after the López vs. Kambosos card was postponed multiple times, the fight against McBride ultimately did not materialize, leading Holyfield to file a demand for arbitration against Triller.

On September 3, 2021, it was reported that Oscar De La Hoya, who had been slated to headline a Triller PPV show against Vitor Belfort on September 11, had been hospitalized with COVID-19, and that Holyfield would be stepping in for De La Hoya. The event was originally scheduled to take place in California, however, the California State Athletic Commission refused to sanction a bout with Holyfield in any capacity–exhibition or professional. The bout was subsequently moved to Florida after the Florida State Athletic Commission agreed to sanction the bout as an exhibition. Holyfield lost via first-round technical knockout.

Personal life

Holyfield is the younger brother of actor and dancer, Bernard Holyfield, and currently lives and trains in Fayette County, Georgia. He is separated from his third wife Candi, with whom he has two children. Holyfield has eleven children with six different women. One of his sons, Evan, followed in his father's footsteps and became a professional boxer. Another son, Elijah, plays football for the Cincinnati Bengals.

He is a born-again Christian.

He founded Real Deal Records which signed the briefly successful group Exhale.

In late 2007 and early 2008, Holyfield was among a number of celebrities to be doing television ads for the restaurant chain Zaxby's.

In 2017, a statue of Evander Holyfield designed by sculptor Brian Hanlon was commissioned by the city of Atlanta for installation in Downtown Atlanta.

Advertising
By 1992, Holyfield was already a household name, endorsing multiple products on television, such as Coca-Cola and Diet Coke. He also had a video game released for the Sega Genesis and the Sega Game Gear: Evander Holyfield's Real Deal Boxing.

In 1996 Holyfield was given the opportunity to carry the Olympic torch when it was on its way to his hometown of Atlanta for that year's Olympics.

On September 22, 2007, Holyfield released the Real Deal Grill cooking appliance via TV infomercials. The Real Deal Grill is manufactured by Cirtran Corp.

Celebrity appearances
Holyfield's popularity has led to numerous television appearances for the boxer. His first television show appearance was the Christmas special of the Fresh Prince of Bel-Air in 1990, playing himself.

Holyfield had minor roles in three movies during the 1990s, Summer of Sam, Necessary Roughness, and Blood Salvage (which he also produced). He made a guest appearance on Nickelodeon's Nickelodeon GUTS during its third season in 1994.

He appeared once in an episode of children animated series Phineas and Ferb. In the episode, he is an animated character but the producers wanted to make the most of Holyfield's ear, so his animated character was only given half an ear.

In 2005, Holyfield came in fifth place on ABC's Dancing with the Stars with his partner Edyta Sliwinska. He also made an appearance on the original BBC Strictly Come Dancing "Champion of Champions" showdown, which featured the final four teams from the 2005 edition of the British series, plus two celebrities from spinoff versions, paired with British professional dancers, one featuring Holyfield paired with Karen Hardy, and Rachel Hunter paired with Brendan Cole.

On August 13, 2007, Holyfield was confirmed to participate in a boxing match at World Wrestling Entertainment's Saturday Night's Main Event XXXV against Matt Hardy. He replaced Montel Vontavious Porter, who had to pull out after being legitimately diagnosed with a heart condition that was not part of a storyline.

Holyfield appeared as himself in the 2011 remake of Arthur.

On January 3, 2014, Holyfield became the 12th housemate to enter the 13th series of Celebrity Big Brother (UK). On January 6, 2014, he was reprimanded by the show after saying in a conversation with another housemate that gayness is abnormal and can be fixed. On January 10, 2014, he became the first housemate to be evicted.

In 2015, Evander Holyfield and Mitt Romney participated in a friendly bout for charity; the event took place in Utah to help the organization CharityVision

In May 2016, Holyfield entered the Argentine dancing reality show Bailando 2016.

Financial difficulties
In June 2008 a legal notice was placed by Washington Mutual Bank stating that Holyfield's $10 million, 109-room, 17-bathroom suburban Atlanta estate would be auctioned off on July 1, 2008, due to foreclosure, shortly before that bank's insolvency. Rapper Rick Ross ended up acquiring the house. Adding to his financial problems, Toi Irvin, mother of his then 10-year-old son, filed suit for non-payment of two months child support (he was paying $3,000 per month for this child). A Utah landscaping firm also went to court seeking $550,000 in unpaid debt for services. His fortune was drained by frivolous spending, multiple failed business ventures, constant child support payments, and his three divorces, among other things.

In 2012 The Independent described Holyfield as "flat broke and bankrupt" despite having earned £350 million (US$513 million) over his boxing career.

As of 2019, Holyfield was earning about $1.2 million a year, mostly through personal appearances.

Allegations of steroid and HGH use
On February 28, 2007, Holyfield was anonymously linked to Applied Pharmacy Services, a pharmacy in Alabama that was under investigation for supplying athletes with illegal steroids and human growth hormone (HGH). He denied ever using performance enhancers.

Holyfield's name does not appear in the law enforcement documents reviewed. However, a patient by the name of "Evan Fields" caught investigators' attention. "Fields" shares the same birth date as Holyfield, October 19, 1962. The listed address for "Fields" was 794 Evander, Fairfield, Ga. 30213. Holyfield has a very similar address. When the phone number that, according to the documents, was associated with the "Fields" prescription, was dialed, Holyfield answered.

On March 10, 2007, Holyfield made a public announcement that he would be pursuing his own investigation into the steroid claims in order to clear his name.

Holyfield was again linked to HGH in September 2007, when his name came up following a raid of Signature Pharmacy in Orlando, Florida.
Signature Pharmacy was under investigation for illegally supplying several professional athletes with steroids and HGH.

Professional boxing record

Exhibition boxing record

Pay-per-view bouts

See also
List of cruiserweight boxing champions
List of heavyweight boxing champions
List of WBA world champions
List of WBC world champions
List of IBF world champions
List of undisputed boxing champions

References

External links

Evander Holyfield profile at Cyber Boxing Zone
Boxing Hall of Fame
ESPN.com

Article about Holyfield vs. Ibragimov at Yahoo Sports

1962 births
African-American boxers
African-American Christians
American sportspeople in doping cases
Boxers at the 1983 Pan American Games
Boxers at the 1984 Summer Olympics
Boxers from Alabama
Boxers from Georgia (U.S. state)
Doping cases in boxing
Heavyweight boxers
International Boxing Federation champions
Light-heavyweight boxers
Living people
National Golden Gloves champions
Olympic bronze medalists for the United States in boxing
Participants in American reality television series
People from Atmore, Alabama
People from Fayette County, Georgia
World Boxing Association champions
World Boxing Council champions
World cruiserweight boxing champions
World heavyweight boxing champions
American male boxers
Medalists at the 1984 Summer Olympics
Pan American Games silver medalists for the United States
International Boxing Hall of Fame inductees
Pan American Games medalists in boxing
American Christians
American autobiographers
BBC Sports Personality World Sport Star of the Year winners
Sportspeople from the Atlanta metropolitan area
Medalists at the 1983 Pan American Games
21st-century African-American people
20th-century African-American sportspeople
Participants in Argentine reality television series
Bailando por un Sueño (Argentine TV series) participants